The Ngaio Marsh Awards (formerly Ngaio Marsh Award), popularly called the Ngaios, are literary awards presented annually in New Zealand to recognise excellence in crime fiction, mystery, and thriller writing. The Awards were established by journalist and legal editor Craig Sisterson in 2010, and are named after Dame Ngaio Marsh, one of the four Queens of Crime of the Golden Age of Detective Fiction. The Award is presented at the WORD Christchurch Writers & Readers Festival in Christchurch, the hometown of Dame Ngaio.

Beginnings 
The Ngaio Marsh Award for Best Crime Novel was launched in 2010 by lawyer turned journalist Craig Sisterson, who wanted to create an opportunity for great New Zealand crime, mystery, and thriller writing to be recognised and celebrated. Local crime writers were often overlooked by festival organisers and books awards in New Zealand, despite international acclaim, and up until that point New Zealand, unlike most other English-speaking countries, did not have a specific award for crime, mystery, and thriller fiction.

Sisterson had been writing reviews and features about crime writers for a number of magazines and newspapers in New Zealand and Australia and had set up a website about New Zealand crime writing. Earlier in 2010, he had written an opinion piece, "Kiwis love crime fiction, but what about our own?" for Booknotes magazine saying that New Zealand had great crime writers who were not being supported locally, by bookstores, literary festivals, or awards, and it was time that changed.

After discussions with many people in the New Zealand book industry, Sisterson decided to launch the Ngaio Marsh Award at the Christchurch Writers Festival in 2010, honouring both contemporary crime writers and New Zealand's most famous mystery writer in her own hometown. He sought and received the blessing of Dame Ngaio Marsh's closest living relative to honour Dame Ngaio by using her name and an artistic impression of her likeness for New Zealand's first-ever crime fiction prize.

The inaugural award was intended to be presented at the biennial Christchurch Writers Festival in September 2010, but had to be postponed due to a severe earthquake that struck the city that month, leading to the cancellation of the festival. The first Ngaio Marsh Award was presented at a special event in Christchurch in December 2010, and won by the pseudonymous author Alix Bosco for the thriller Cut & Run. Bosco did not attend the presentation ceremony, but would later reveal 'herself' as New Zealand screenwriter and playwright Greg McGee in the lead-up to the 2011 Award.

The launch of the Award, and New Zealand crime writing in general, was featured in major newspapers and magazines in New Zealand, including the Sunday Star-Times, the Herald on Sunday, and the New Zealand Listener.

The Award 
For the first three years of the Award, the winner received a distinctive handcrafted trophy designed and created by New Zealand sculptor and Unitec art lecturer Gina Ferguson, a full set of Ngaio Marsh novels, and a cash prize provided by the Christchurch Writers Festival Trust. The trophy depicted an artistic rendering of Dame Ngaio's famous visage in mother-of-pearl on a black velvet covered partially open book.

From 2013, the winners have received a framed plaque bearing the award logo, a selection of Ngaio Marsh novels, and a cash prize.

In 2016, a second category was added for debut crime novels, the Ngaio Marsh Award for Best First Novel, and in 2017 a new award for true crime and other non fiction writing was added, the Ngaio Marsh Award for Best Non Fiction. 2021 saw the addition of a further award, the Ngaio Marsh Award for Younger Readers.

Award presentations 
Following the postponement of the inaugural event when the biennial Christchurch Writers Festival was cancelled in 2010, the Award has been presented at a variety of events in association with the Christchurch Writers Festival, which has continued its support of the Award, each year. In 2011, the "Setting the Stage for Murder" event was held at the Christchurch Arts Festival, with all four finalists and internationally bestselling crime writers Tess Gerritsen and John Hart in attendance.

In 2012, 2014, and 2016 the Ngaios were presented at events as part of the Christchurch Writers Festival programme, in each case following the popular 'Great New Zealand Crime Debate'. In 2012 Australian crime writer Michael Robotham presented the Award, and in 2014 Icelandic crime writer Yrsa Sigurdardottir presented the Award. Sigurdardottir became a judge of the Ngaios from 2015.

Winners and finalists

2010 
The inaugural presentation was made in Christchurch after a standalone crime panel featuring two of the three finalists, Neil Cross and Vanda Symon, local crime writer Paul Cleave, and chaired by Sisterson. The third finalist, Alix Bosco, did not attend as it was a pseudonym for a "successful writer in other media" who wanted to keep their identity a secret. Bosco's debut thriller, CUT & RUN, was announced as the winner at the conclusion of the event, with representatives from publisher Penguin NZ accepting on the author's behalf.

Cut & Run by Alix Bosco Containment by Vanda Symon
 Burial by Neil Cross

 2011 
The second presentation of the Ngaio Marsh Award was made following the "Setting the Stage for Murder" event held as part of the Christchurch Arts Festival in August 2011, which also included appearances by New York Times bestselling authors Tess Gerritsen and John Hart. At the event, acclaimed television screenwriter and playwright Greg McGee made his first appearance after revealing himself as Alix Bosco, the winner of the inaugural award, in a national newspaper in the lead-up to the 2011 Award.Blood Men by Paul Cleave Hunting Blind by Paddy Richardson
 Captured by Neil Cross
 Slaughter Falls by Alix Bosco

 2012 
The third presentation was during an event at the 2012 Christchurch Writers Festival, which was held in temporary facilities as the city continued to recover from the devastating September 2010 and February 2011 earthquakes. Award-winning Australian crime writer Michael Robotham presented the Award to Neil Cross following the sold-out Great New Zealand Crime Debate. Cross's winning novel was a prequel to his award-winning television series Luther, starring Idris Elba.Luther: The Calling by Neil Cross Collecting Cooper by Paul Cleave
 By Any Means by Ben Sanders
 Bound by Vanda Symon

 2013 
In the fourth year of the Award, the presentation was made privately as logistical issues didn't allow for a public event.Death on Demand by Paul Thomas The Laughterhouse by Paul Cleave
 Little Sister by Julian Novitz
 The Faceless by Vanda Symon

 2014 
The 2014 presentation was made at the WORD Christchurch Writers Festival following the Great Crime Debate where finalist Paul Cleave competed in the negative team (rather ironically) debating the moot, 'Crime Doesn't Pay'.  The negative team won in a landslide victory. Liam McIlvanney was in attendance to receive the award from Icelandic crime writer Yrsa Sigurdardottir

 Where The Dead Men Go - Liam McIlvanney Joe Victim by Paul Cleave
 Frederick's Coat by Alan Duff
 My Brother's Keeper by Donna Malane

 2015 
The sixth presentation of the award was made at a special "Murder in the Court" event held at the Court Theatre in Christchurch in October.

 Five Minutes Alone - Paul Cleave The Petticoat Men by Barbara Ewing
 The Children's Pond by Tina Shaw
 Swimming in the Dark by Paddy Richardson
 Fallout by Paul Thomas

 2016 
The Seventh presentation of the award was at the Great New Zealand Crime Debate during WORD Christchurch Writers and Readers festival 2016, on 27 August 2016 at the Concert Hall of The Piano: Centre for Music and the Arts, Christchurch. This year there were two awards, one for best crime novel and one for best first novel.

Best Crime Novel
 Trust No One by Paul Cleave Inside the Black Horse by Ray Berard
 Made to Kill by Adam Christopher
 The Legend of Winstone Blackhat by Tanya Moir
 American Blood by Ben Sanders

 Best First Novel (new award)
 Inside the Black Horse by Ray Berard
 The Fixer by John Daniell
 The Gentlemen’s Club by Jen Shieff 
 Twister by Jane Woodham

2017 
The eighth presentation of the Ngaios was made at Scorpio Books in Christchurch on 28 October 2017, as part of a cocktail function followed by a literary pub quiz.

Best Crime Novel
The Last Time We Spoke by Fiona Sussman
Pancake Money by Finn Bell
Spare Me The Truth by C. J. Carver
Red Herring by Jonothan Cullinane
Marshall's Law by Ben Sanders

Best First Novel 
 Dead Lemons by Finn Bell
 Red Herring by Jonothan Cullinane
 The Ice Shroud by Gordon Ell
 The Student Body by Simon Wyatt
 Days Are Like Grass by Sue Younger

Best Non Fiction (new award)
 In Dark Places: The confessions of Teina Pora and an ex-cops fight for justice by Michael Bennett
 The Scene of the Crime by Steve Braunias
 Double-Edged Sword by Simonne Butler with Andra Jenkin
 The Many Deaths of Mary Dobie by David Hastings
 Blockbuster!: Fergus Hume and the Mystery of a Hansom Cab by Lucy Sussex

2018 

The finalists were celebrated and winners announced at special event on 1 September 2018 as part of the 2018 WORD Christchurch Festival.

Best Crime Novel
 Marlborough Man by Alan Carter
 See You in September by Charity Norman
 Tess by Kirsten McDougall
 The Sound of Her Voice by Nathan Blackwell
 A Killer Harvest by Paul Cleave
 The Hidden Room by Stella Duffy

Best First Novel 
 All Our Secrets by Jennifer Lane
The Floating Basin by Carolyn Hawes
 Broken Silence by Helen Vivienne Fletcher
 The Sound of Her Voice by Nathan Blackwell
 Nothing Bad Happens Here by Nikki Crutchley

2019 
The shortlists were published on 2 August and the winners were announced on 14 September at WORD Christchurch.

Best Crime Novel
This Mortal Boy by Fiona Kidman
Money in the Morgue by Ngaio Marsh and Stella Duffy
The Quaker by Liam Mcilvanney
Call Me Evie by J. P. Pomare
The Vanishing Act by Jen Shieff

Best First Novel 
 Call Me Evie by J. P. Pomare
 One for Another by Andrea Jacka
 Crystal Reign by Kelly Lyndon

Best Non Fiction
 The Short Life And Mysterious Death Of Jane Furlong by Kelly Dennett
 The Great New Zealand Robbery by Scott Bainbridge
 Behind Bars by Anna Leask
 The Cause of Death by Cynric Temple-Camp

2020 
The shortlists were published on 11 August and the winners were announced on 31 October at WORD Christchurch.

Best Crime Novel
 Auē by Becky Manawatu
 Whatever it Takes by Paul Cleave
 Girl from the Tree House by Gudrun Frerichs
 The Nancys by R. W. R. McDonald
 In the Clearing by J. P. Pomare
 The Wild Card by Renée

Best First Novel 
 The Nancys by R. W. R. McDonald
Into the Void by Christina O’Reilly
 Tugga’s Mob by Stephen Johnson
 Auē by Becky Manawatu

2021 
The longlists were announced in July, while the shortlists were published on 16 September and the winners were announced on 30 October by WORD Christchurch.

Best Crime Novel 

 Sprigs by Brannavan Gnanalingam
 The Murder Club by Nikki Crutchley
 The Tally Stick by Carl Nixon
 The Secrets of Strangers by Charity Norman
 Tell Me Lies by J. P. Pomare

Best First Novel 

 For Reasons of Their Own by Chris Stuart
The Girl in the Mirror by Rose Carlyle
 The Beautiful Dead by Kim Hunt
 Where the Truth Lies by Karina Kilmore
 While the Fantail Lives by Alan Titchall

Best Non Fiction 

 Black Hands: Inside the Bain family murders by Martin van Beynen
Weed: A New Zealand story by James Borrowdale
 Rock College: An unofficial history of Mount Eden Prison by Mark Derby
 From Dog Collar to Dog Collar by Bruce Howat
 Gangland by Jared Savage

Best Younger Readers 

 Katipo Joe: Blitzkrieg by Brian Falkner
 Red Edge by Des Hunt
 A Trio of Sophies by Eileen Merriman
 Deadhead by Glenn Wood

2022 
The longlists were announced in July, while the shortlists were published on 14 September and the winners were announced on 15 September by WORD Christchurch.

Best Crime Novel 

 Before You Knew My Name by Jacqueline Bublitz

 The Quiet People by Paul Cleave
 Nancy Business by R. W. R. McDonald
 She’s a Killer by Kirsten McDougall
 The Devils You Know by Ben Sanders
 Quiet in Her Bones by Nalini Singh

Best First Novel 

 Before You Knew My Name by Jacqueline Bublitz
 Shadow Over Edmund Street by Suzanne Frankham
 Isobar Precinct by Angelique Kasmara
 Waking the Tiger by Mark Wightman
 Small Mouth Demon by Matt Zwartz

References

External links
Ngaio Marsh Award Facebook page

New Zealand fiction awards
Mystery and detective fiction awards
2010 establishments in New Zealand
Awards established in 2010